

A–Z

Documentaries

Short films

References

Bibliography
 Klaus, Ulrich J. Deutsche Tonfilme: Jahrgang 1938. Klaus-Archiv, 1988.

External links 
IMDB listing for German films made in 1938
filmportal.de listing for films made in 1938

German
Lists of German films
film